Sunset Song is a 2015 British drama film written and directed by Terence Davies and starring Agyness Deyn, Peter Mullan and Kevin Guthrie. It is an adaptation of Lewis Grassic Gibbon's 1932 novel of the same name. It was shown in the Special Presentations section of the 2015 Toronto International Film Festival and was released in the United Kingdom on 4 December 2015. The film follows Chris Guthrie, the daughter of a Scottish farmer in the early 1900s.

Plot
The film tells the story of an Aberdeenshire farm girl Chris Guthrie (Agyness Deyn). Chris is a sensitive writer and extremely good at school, particularly in languages. She lives with her domineering and abusive father, her warm and kind mother, her brother, and two younger siblings. After her father rapes her mother, resulting in the birth of twins, the family moves to a larger home in Kindraddie. While there Chris begins to study at college to become a teacher.

One day Chris's mother warns her of the horror of being raped and shortly after commits suicide, poisoning both herself and her twin newborns. Chris quits her studies and she and her brother commit to helping their father on the farm, while their two younger siblings go to live with their childless aunt and uncle. Chris's brother Will warns her not to let her father run her down the way he did with their mother and tells her his hope of running off to Canada.

Will does eventually leave, though for Aberdeen, though not before briefly introducing her to his friend, fellow farmer Ewan Tavendale.

Chris's father John eventually suffers a debilitating stroke putting the care of the farm entirely on Chris, especially after she learns that her brother has married and sailed for Argentina with his new bride. He also tries to rape Chris, though because of his physical condition he is unable to. He dies shortly afterwards leaving all his property and money to Chris. Rather than sell off his possessions she decides to stay on the farm. Very quickly afterwards she and Ewan fall in love and decide to get married and Chris is relieved that she will be able to stay in Kindraddie.

Chris and Ewan have a loving marriage and she gives birth to a son, Ewan Jr, just as the start of World War I. Ewan at first refuses to enlist, but knowing that conscription will soon be passed he eventually decides to go to war. Ewan comes back on leave a changed man. Violent and abrasive he rapes Chris and the two part on bad terms. Chris eventually receives mail informing her that Ewan is dead. She learns from her friend Chae that Ewan was executed as a deserter because he tried to return home to see Chris, devastated that he never got to kiss her goodbye the last time he saw her.

Cast

 Agyness Deyn as Chris Guthrie
 Peter Mullan as John Guthrie, father of Chris
 Kevin Guthrie as Ewan Tavendale
 Jack Greenlees as Will Guthrie
 Daniela Nardini as Jena Guthrie
 Ian Pirie as Chae Strachan                                                                        
 Douglas Rankine as Long Rob
 Mark Bonnar as Reverend Gibbon
 Simon Tait as Dr. Meldrum
 Niall Greig Fulton as John Brigson
 Trish Mullin as Mistress Melon
 Julian Nest as Mr. Semple, lawyer
 Linda Duncan McLaughlin as Auntie Janet
 Ron Donachie as Uncle Tam
 Jamie Michie as Mr. Kinloch
 Niall Greig Fulton as John Brigson
 Jim Sweeney as Preacher
 Hugh Ross as School Inspector
 David Ganly as Tinker
 Tom Duncan as McIvor

Production
The film features Peter Mullan and Kevin Guthrie, and was shot in New Zealand, Luxembourg and Scotland. It was produced by Iris Productions, SellOut Pictures and Hurricane Films and backed by BFI, Creative Scotland, BBC Scotland and Luxembourg Film Fund.

Trailer
The official trailer was released as an exclusive with The Guardian on 10 November 2015.

References

External links
 

2015 films
2010s historical drama films
British historical drama films
English-language Luxembourgian films
Films about farmers
Films based on British novels
Films directed by Terence Davies
Films set in the 1900s
Films set on farms
2015 drama films
Films about rape
Films about domestic violence
Films set in Scotland
2010s English-language films
2010s British films